Wolcottsville is a hamlet in the town of Royalton in Niagara County, New York, United States.

Geography 
Wolcottsville is located on the western side of the Tonawanda Wildlife Management Area.  Its main street is Wolcottsville Road.  Note that Wolcottsburg is a different hamlet located to the south in Erie County, New York.

References

Hamlets in New York (state)
Hamlets in Niagara County, New York